Jon Molin (born 20 October, 1956) is an American former professional tennis player.

Molin, raised in New York City, was a collegiate tennis player for Columbia University and had a stint as the team's captain. He featured in the singles and doubles main draws at the 1979 US Open. A qualifier in the singles, he lost his first round match to Gene Malin in four sets. He had a best singles world ranking of 248.

References

External links
 
 

1956 births
Living people
American male tennis players
Columbia Lions men's tennis players
Tennis people from New York (state)